Bertoni's antbird (Drymophila rubricollis) is a species of bird in the family Thamnophilidae. It is found in the Atlantic Forest of south-eastern Brazil, eastern Paraguay and far north-eastern Argentina (Selva Misionera). It was formerly considered conspecific with the very similar ferruginous antbird.

The bird's common name commemorates the ornithologist  Arnoldo de Winkelried Bertoni (1857–1929).

References

Bertoni's antbird
Birds of the Atlantic Forest
Birds of the Selva Misionera
Bertoni's antbird
Taxonomy articles created by Polbot
Taxa named by Arnoldo de Winkelried Bertoni